Rocca d'Arazzo is a comune (municipality) in the Province of Asti in the Italian region Piedmont, located about  southeast of Turin and about  southeast of Asti.

Rocca d'Arazzo borders the following municipalities: Asti, Azzano d'Asti, Castello di Annone, Mombercelli, Montaldo Scarampi, Montegrosso d'Asti, Rocchetta Tanaro, and Vigliano d'Asti.

References

Cities and towns in Piedmont